Víctor David López (born 20 April 1987) is an Argentine footballer who plays for Independiente Chivilcoy.

Career
López signed with Greek club Panathinaikos F.C. and was loaned to Greek second division side Egaleo F.C. for one season in August 2009.

References

External links
 
 Profile at epae.org
 

1987 births
Living people
Argentine footballers
Argentine expatriate footballers
Egaleo F.C. players
Panathinaikos F.C. players
All Boys footballers
Expatriate footballers in Greece
Association football forwards